Eilema rufofasciata is a moth of the  subfamily Arctiinae. It was described by Rothschild in 1912. It is found in the Democratic Republic of Congo and Kenya.

References

 Natural History Museum Lepidoptera generic names catalog

rufofasciata
Moths described in 1912